Thomas Ellis (1 March 1828 – date of death unknown) was an English first-class cricketer.

Ellis was born at Birmingham in March 1828. He played first-class cricket for Yorkshire from 1849–51, making eight appearances. He made two appearances in 1849 against Lancashire, following these up with a single appearance against an All England Eleven in 1850. He made four further appearances in 1851, with two appearances each against Lancashire and Surrey. He scored a total of 75 runs in his eight matches, with a high score of 19 not out. As a bowler, he took 17 wickets at a bowling average of 8.20, with one five wicket haul against Lancashire in 1851. In addition to playing first-class cricket, he also stood as an umpire in a single first-class match between Manchester and Sheffield in 1852.

References

External links

1828 births
Date of death unknown
Cricketers from Birmingham, West Midlands
English cricketers
Yorkshire cricketers
English cricket umpires
English cricketers of 1826 to 1863